George William Archibald (1890 – April 5, 1927) was an American jockey. He rode the winning horse Meridian in the 1911 Kentucky Derby. He was also a Champion Jockey in Germany four times (1913-1916) where he rode for Baron Simon Alfred Oppenheim's Schlenderhan stable. He won the 1912 German St. Leger on Royal Blue, the 1913 German 2000 Guineas and Austrian Derby on Csardas and German Oaks and German St. Leger on Orchidee II and the 1914 German 2000 Guineas on Terminus and German Derby on Ariel. Moved to Spain where he won three times the Gran Premio de Madrid (1919,20,21). Archibald came to England in 1922 to take up retainer with Peter Gilpin at Clarehaven Stables in Newmarket. He won the 2000 Guineas Stakes with St Louis. He rode in the Epsom Derby for King George VI. His other good mounts included that year's leading 2 year old, Town Guard, and the Irish 2000 Guineas and Irish Derby winner, Spike Island. Further important winners included A. K. Macomber's Rose Prince in the Cesarewitch Handicap and a dead-heat in the Irish Derby abroad Zodiac in 1924. In all he rode one hundred and eighty winners in England. His best year was 1924, when he scored in fifty two races.

George Archibald died of heart failure on April 5, 1927.

References

1890 births
1927 deaths
American jockeys
British jockeys
Sportspeople from San Francisco